Chempaka may refer to:

 Chempaka (Kelantan state constituency), a constituency in the Kelantan State Legislative Assembly in Malaysia
 Chempaka (Selangor state constituency), a former constituency in the Selangor State Legislative Assembly in Malaysia

See also 
 Cempaka (disambiguation)